Rookie of the Year is the debut album from San Francisco rapper Ya Boy. It was released on May 31, 2005. Guests include San Quinn, Bailey, Big Rich, Messy Marv, Roscoe, Clyde Carson, Turf Talk, E-40, and others.

Track listing

References

External links
Amazon.com: Rookie of the Year
Billboard.com: Rookie of the Year

2005 debut albums
Albums produced by Cozmo
Albums produced by Droop-E
Albums produced by Rick Rock
SMC Recordings albums
Ya Boy albums